The Solomon Arter House is a historic two-story, three-bay log home in Union Mills, Carroll County, Maryland, United States. It was built in about 1810 by Solomon Arter, a member of the Arter family that was prominent in the Pennsylvania German culture of this region. The structure is representative of Pennsylvania German domestic architecture in Carroll County, and is significant for the preservation of its interior stenciling. Also on the property is an 1872 bank barn, hogpen, and 1883 frame Victorian tenant house.

The Solomon Arter House was listed on the National Register of Historic Places in 1987.

The house lies outside area of the proposed Union Mills Reservoir.

References

External links
 , including photo in 1985, at Maryland Historical Trust
 , possibly related to Solomon Arter and built in 1795

Houses in Carroll County, Maryland
Houses on the National Register of Historic Places in Maryland
Pennsylvania Dutch culture in Maryland
Union Mills, Maryland
National Register of Historic Places in Carroll County, Maryland